Alexander Bommes (born January 21, 1976 in Kiel) is a German handball player, journalist and television host.

Life 
Bommes played for TSV Bayer Dormagen from 1999 to 2001 and for VfL Gummersbach from 2001 to 2003 in the Handball-Bundesliga. 
Bommes works as a television host and sports programme journalist on German broadcasters NDR and ARD. He has two sons with television host Julia Westlake.

Television 
– as television host –
 since 2009: Sportclub, NDR
since 2011: Sportschau am Sonntag, Das Erste
 since 2012: Gefragt – Gejagt, NDR, Das Erste since 18 May 2015
 since 2013: Sportschau Club, Das Erste
 since 2015: Tietjen und Bommes, NDR
 since 2015: Sportschau live: Fußball, Das Erste
 since 2015: Sportschau am Samstag, Das Erste

 2008–2014: Hamburg Journal, NDR
 2008: Wahlberichterstattung Hamburg, NDR
 2009: Liga 3 – Fußball, NDR
 2009: Liga 1 – Handball, NDR
 2009: Stadt gegen Land – Das Wissensduell, NDR
 2009–2011: Hafengeburtstag Hamburg, NDR
 2011–2013: Top Flops – Die lustigsten Fernsehpannen, NDR
 2012: Olympische Sommerspiele 2012, Telegramm host, Das Erste
 2012: Sommer-Paralympics 2012, Main host, Das Erste
 2012: Deutsche Leichtathletik-Meisterschaften 2012, Das Erste
 2013–2014: NDR-Quizshow, NDR
 2013–2014: Boxen im Ersten, Das Erste
 2014: Olympische Winterspiele 2014, Telegramm host, Das Erste
 2014: Fußball-Weltmeisterschaft 2014, WM Club host, Das Erste
 2014: Deutschland feiert die Weltmeister, Das Erste and ZDF
 2016: Super, Jungs! – Empfang der Handball-Nationalmannschaft in Berlin, Das Erste
 2016: Olympische Sommerspiele 2016, Das Erste
 2016: Bambi (award show), Das Erste

– as interviewer –

 2011: 2011 World Championships in Athletics, Das Erste
 2011: 2011 FIFA Women's World Cup, Das Erste
 2012: 2012 European Men's Handball Championship, Das Erste
 2012: 2012 European Athletics Championships, Das Erste
 2013: 2013 World Men's Handball Championship, Das Erste
 2013: 2013 World Championships in Athletics, Das Erste

References

External links

ARD: Alexaner Bommes verstärkt ab August 2014 das Fussball Moderatorenteam im Ersten

1976 births
Sportspeople from Kiel
Living people
German sports journalists
21st-century German journalists
German television talk show hosts
German television journalists
German sports broadcasters
German game show hosts
VfL Gummersbach players
ARD (broadcaster) people
Norddeutscher Rundfunk people